The Fournier RF-10 is a two-seat motor glider designed by René Fournier in 1981. The aircraft is a further development of the RF-9 and incorporated plastic and carbon-fiber structures.

The aircraft has also been license manufactured in Brazil as the AMT 100 Ximango.

Operators

 Portuguese Air Force received four RF-10s in 1984.

Specifications (RF-10)

References

Bibliography
 
 

1980s French sailplanes
Fournier aircraft
Motor gliders
T-tail aircraft
Low-wing aircraft
Single-engined tractor aircraft
Aircraft first flown in 1981